V. M. Vinu is an Indian film director who works in Malayalam cinema.

Early life
V. M. Vinu was born in a middle-class family in Kozhikode, Kerala. His father, Vinayan is a novelist & playwright. While studying in school, Vinu acted in AIR Dramas like S.K.Pottekad's 'Oru Desathinte Katha' and M.Mukundan's 'Mayyazhi Puzhayude Theerangalil'. He completed his BA Degree course from Calicut University, then completed BTA from School of Drama (Calicut University) under Prof. G. Sankara Pillai. He had participated in many art and cultural activities while studying and won best actor and director award in school and college.

Personal life
V. M. Vinu is married. The couple have a son Varun and a daughter Varsha who is currently pursuing her graduation in Providence Women's College. She acted as Mammootty's elder daughter in Vesham.

Career
After college, he started as an assistant director and has worked as an assistant to many directors before being an independent director. He worked as an assistant director in 7 movies and associate director in 8 movies. Some of them are 'Ore thooval pakshigal' directed by Raveendran, 'Abhyam' directed by Shivan and 'Sooryamanasam', directed by Viji Thampi. After being independent he directed 13 films. He has many hits to his credits with stars like Mamootty and Mohanlal.

Filmography 
 Kuttymama (2019)
 Marupadi (2016)
 Face to Face (2012)
 Penpattanam (2010)
 Makante Achan (2009)
 Sooryan (2007)
 Yes Your Honour (2006)
 Bus Conductor (2005)
 Vesham (2004)
 Mayilattam (2004)
 Balettan (2003)
 Kanmashi (2002)
 Akashathile Paravakal (2001)
 Pallavur Devanarayanan (1999) 
 Oro Viliyum Kathorthu (1998)
 Ancharakalyanam (1997)
 Swarna Kireedam (1996)
 Harichandanam (unreleased) (1993)

References

External links
 

Malayalam film directors
Artists from Kozhikode
Living people
1968 births
Film directors from Kerala
20th-century Indian film directors
21st-century Indian film directors